Sir George Anthony Clark, 3rd Baronet, DL (24 January 1914 – 20 February 1991) was an Orangeman and unionist politician in Northern Ireland.

The son of Sir George Clark, 2nd Baronet, of Dunlambert, Clark studied at Canford School before becoming a farmer and company director.  At the 1938 Northern Ireland general election, he was elected for the Ulster Unionist Party in Belfast Dock, although he lost his seat at the 1945 general election. During World War II, he served as a captain in the Black Watch, and in 1951, he succeeded as the 3rd Baronet.

Clark was elected to the Senate of Northern Ireland in 1951, serving until 1969, and acting as a Deputy Speaker from 1957 until 1959. In 1954, he was appointed High Sheriff of Antrim. In 1957, he became Grand Master of the Grand Orange Lodge of Ireland, filling the position for ten years. From 1958 to 1961, he was the Imperial Grand President of the Imperial Grand Orange Council of the World.  He also Deputy Lieutenant for the City of Belfast in 1961, and Chairman of the Standing Committee of the Ulster Unionist Council from 1967 to 1972.  From 1980 to 1990, he was President of the Ulster Unionist Council, then became its Patron until his death the following year.

He married Nancy Catherine Clark (born 1927 d, 2016), her maiden name also being Clark, of Upperlands, County Londonderry. They had one daughter, Elizabeth (Reid). He was succeeded in the baronetcy by his brother, Sir Colin Clark, 4th Baronet.

Arms

References

External links
 Photograph of Sir George

1914 births
1991 deaths
Baronets in the Baronetage of the United Kingdom
Black Watch officers
Deputy Lieutenants of Belfast
High Sheriffs of Antrim
Ulster Unionist Party members of the House of Commons of Northern Ireland
Members of the House of Commons of Northern Ireland 1938–1945
Members of the Senate of Northern Ireland 1949–1953
Members of the Senate of Northern Ireland 1953–1957
Members of the Senate of Northern Ireland 1957–1961
Members of the Senate of Northern Ireland 1961–1965
Members of the Senate of Northern Ireland 1965–1969
People educated at Canford School
Grand Masters of the Orange Order
Members of the House of Commons of Northern Ireland for Belfast constituencies
Ulster Unionist Party members of the Senate of Northern Ireland